Mohamed Benyahia (born 30 June 1992) is an Algerian professional footballer who plays as a defender for Saudi club Al-Suqoor.

Club career
In June 2015, Benyahia signed a two-year contract with USM Alger.

On 21 August 2022, Benyahia joined Saudi Arabian club Al-Suqoor.

International career
In 2009, Benyahia was a member of the Algerian Under-17 National Team that finished second at the 2009 African U-17 Championship.

Honours

Club
 USM Alger
 Algerian Ligue Professionnelle 1 (1): 2018–19
 Algerian Super Cup (1): 2016

References

External links

Mohamed Benyahia career statistics at foot-national.com

1992 births
Living people
People from Tremblay-en-France
French footballers
Association football defenders
Nîmes Olympique players
CA Bastia players
Ligue 2 players
Championnat National players
Algeria youth international footballers
Algerian footballers
Algerian expatriate footballers
French sportspeople of Algerian descent
MC Oran players
USM Alger players
Algerian Ligue Professionnelle 1 players
Algerian Ligue 2 players
Saudi Second Division players
2017 Africa Cup of Nations players
Footballers from Seine-Saint-Denis
ES Sétif players
JSM Skikda players
Al-Thoqbah Club players
Al-Suqoor FC players
Expatriate footballers in Saudi Arabia
Algerian expatriate sportspeople in Saudi Arabia